Adil Sassa is a Moroccan professional footballer who plays as a defender for DHJ.

International career
In January 2014, coach Hassan Benabicha, invited him to be a part of the Moroccan squad for the 2014 African Nations Championship. He helped the team to top group B after drawing with Burkina Faso and Zimbabwe and defeating Uganda. The team was eliminated from the competition at the quarter final zone after losing to Nigeria.

References

Living people
Moroccan footballers
Morocco A' international footballers
2014 African Nations Championship players
1981 births
Place of birth missing (living people)
Association football defenders
Difaâ Hassani El Jadidi players
People from Tétouan